Daniele Pellissier (9 February 1904 – 8 November 1972) was an Italian cross-country skier.

Pellissier was born in the Aosta Valley. He finished 15th at the 1924 Winter Olympics in Chamonix at the competition of 18-km-cross-country skiing and took part as a soldier at the Italian military patrol team at the 1928 Winter Olympics in St. Moritz (demonstration). The team finished fourth. Also in 1928, he won the third place in the 35 kilometres event of the Italian men's championships of cross-country skiing.

References

External links
 
Memorial to Daniele Pellissier

1904 births
1972 deaths
Italian military patrol (sport) runners
Italian male cross-country skiers
Olympic biathletes of Italy
Olympic cross-country skiers of Italy
Cross-country skiers at the 1924 Winter Olympics
Military patrol competitors at the 1928 Winter Olympics
Cross-country skiers at the 1928 Winter Olympics
Sportspeople from Aosta Valley